Blood Magick Necromance is the ninth studio album by the Austrian blackened death metal band Belphegor.  It was released on 14 January 2011 through Nuclear Blast. The album was recorded by Peter Tägtgren at Abyss Studios in Sweden.

A music videos have been shot for the songs "Impaled Upon the Tongue of Sathan" and "In Blood - Devour This Sanctity", directed by Alexander Koenig and Andrey Kovalev, respectively. The album features cover art by Joachim Luetke who previously worked with Arch Enemy, Dimmu Borgir and Kreator among others.

Track listing

Personnel

Charts

Release history

References

   

Belphegor albums
2011 albums
Nuclear Blast albums
German-language albums
Albums produced by Peter Tägtgren